The men's 'Soft Styles with Weapons' category involved just five contestants from four countries across three continents - Europe, Asia and North America.  Each contestant went through seven performances (2 minutes each) with the totals added up at the end of the event.  The gold medallist was Russian Evgeny Krylov claiming his second medal in Musical Forms, with compatriot Andrey Bosak gaining silver (and his fourth medal overall).  Michael Moeller from Germany claimed bronze.

Results

See also
List of WAKO Amateur World Championships
List of WAKO Amateur European Championships
List of male kickboxers

References

External links
 WAKO World Association of Kickboxing Organizations Official Site

Kickboxing events at the WAKO World Championships 2007 Coimbra
2007 in kickboxing
Kickboxing in Portugal